Marina district may refer to one of these places:

 Marina District, San Francisco
 Marina, San Diego
 Marina Bay, Singapore